Franklinton is a town in, and the parish seat of Washington Parish, Louisiana, United States. The population was 3,857 at the 2010 census.

A Franklinton physician, Jerry Thomas, represented Washington Parish in the Louisiana House of Representatives from 1988 to 1999. He was elected to the District 12 seat in the state senate, serving from 1999 to 2004. He had succeeded Phil Short of Covington, who resigned. Prior to his state service, Dr. Thomas was the Washington Parish coroner from 1980 to 1988.

Elected in 2015, Beth Mizell, a businesswoman from Franklinton, is the current District 12 state senator.

History 
Franklinton was founded in 1819, originally under the name of Franklin. It was designated as the parish seat of government on February 10, 1821, two years after the parish was carved out from St. Tammany Parish.

In 1826 the town's name was changed to Franklinton, as there was already another town named Franklin in  St. Mary Parish. In 1826, representatives and citizens from both communities showed up in then-state-capital New Orleans to state their cases for keeping the name "Franklin." The legislature allowed Franklin in St. Mary Parish to retain its name, while changing the Washington Parish's newer seat to Franklinton. The parish was largely rural, based in extensive pine forests.

Franklinton has a bunch of solar panels in the surrounding farmland.

20th century to present
1935 lynching: 
In the early hours of January 11, 1935, a small group of white men forced their way into the Washington Parish jail in Franklinton, fatally shooting and beating Jerome Wilson, 30, an African-American man convicted of murder. He had pleaded for mercy. Five days earlier the Louisiana Supreme Court had granted Wilson a new trial, on the grounds that he had not received a fair trial. The decision cited that he was tried, convicted, and sentenced within ten days of his arrest in August in the slaying of Deputy Sheriff Delos C. Wood in a gunfight on the Wilson place.

The lynch party took Wilson's body by car and dumped it along a rural road three miles (5 km) from town; then they dispersed. The body was found by a passerby on the road two hours later. Police officers said they thought Wilson was shot because his cries would have aroused parish authorities, who twice had thwarted attempts to lynch him.

In 2005, much of Franklinton, as well as most of Washington Parish, sustained damage from Hurricane Katrina. It caused extensive damage along the Gulf Coast.

Geography
According to the United States Census Bureau, the town has a total area of 4.2 square miles (10.9 km), of which 4.1 square miles (10.7 km) is land and 0.04 square mile (0.1 km) (0.95%) is water.

The Bogue Chitto River flows through the western edge of the town.

Demographics

2020 census

As of the 2020 United States census, there were 3,662 people, 1,739 households, and 930 families residing in the town.

2000 census
As of the census of 2000, there were 3,657 people, 1,366 households, and 878 families residing in the town. The racial makeup of the town was 47.01% White, 51.87% African American, 0.11% Native American, 0.19% Asian, and 0.82% from two or more races. Hispanic or Latino of any race were 0.49% of the population.

There were 1,366 households, out of which 30.2% had children under the age of 18 living with them, 38.9% were married couples living together, 21.2% had a female householder with no husband present, and 35.7% were non-families. 33.2% of all households were made up of individuals, and 15.7% had someone living alone who was 65 years of age or older.  The average household size was 2.45 and the average family size was 3.13.

In the town, the population was spread out, with 26.9% under the age of 18, 8.6% from 18 to 24, 23.4% from 25 to 44, 22.1% from 45 to 64, and 19.1% who were 65 years of age or older.  The median age was 38 years. For every 100 females, there were 83.1 males.  For every 100 females age 18 and over, there were 77.6 males.

The median income for a household in the town was $20,955, and the median income for a family was $27,957. Males had a median income of $25,268 versus $16,337 for females. The per capita income for the town was $11,273.  About 24.0% of families and 31.3% of the population were below the poverty line, including 41.3% of those under age 18 and 28.7% of those age 65 or over.

Economy
The town's economy is based heavily on the parish agriculture, forestry, and some commercial industry. Many residents commute south into St. Tammany Parish for employment.

Arts and culture
The Washington Parish Free Fair, the largest free fair in the US and the second-largest county fair in Louisiana, is held during the third week of October each year at the Washington Parish Fair Grounds in Franklinton.

Media
The Era-Leader, the oldest newspaper in Washington Parish, is based in Franklinton and covers mainly the western half of the parish.

The Daily News is published three times per week. It is based in Bogalusa but it covers all of the parish.

In popular culture
The book, Dead Man Walking (1993) by Sister Helen Prejean, and the 1995 film of the same name adapted from the book, referred to the murder of Faith Hathaway by Robert Lee Willie and Joseph Vaccaro, and their convictions. The murder took place at Fricke's Cave (now part of Bogue Chitto State Park).

Education
Washington Parish School System
Mount Hermon PreK-12th
Franklinton High School
Franklinton Jr High
Franklinton Elementary School
Franklinton Primary School
Bowling Green School

National Guard
Franklinton is the home of the 843rd Engineer Company. It is part of the 205th Engineer Battalion in Bogalusa, and the larger 225th Engineer Brigade of the Louisiana National Guard.

Notable people
 Lucius Barker, American political scientist
 Twiley Barker, American political scientist
 John L. Crain, president of Southeastern Louisiana University
 Derrick Dillon, professional football player 
 Katherine Haik, Miss Teen USA 2015
 Adrian Magee, professional football player 
 Terrence Magee, professional football player
 Beth Mizell, businesswoman  and Louisiana state senator
 Chanda Rigby, head coach of Troy Trojans women basketball team

Climate
The climate in this area is characterized by hot, humid summers and generally mild to cool winters.  According to the Köppen Climate Classification system, Franklinton has a humid subtropical climate, abbreviated "Cfa" on climate maps.

Further reading
 "Washington Parish, Louisiana," by Janice M. Berfield, 1968
 "History of Washington Parish," by Hon. Prentiss B. Carter
 Bogalusa Story, by C. W. Goodyear
 Bogalusa, Washington Parish, La.: History, links, maps, & photos

References

External links

 Town of Franklinton
 The Daily News, Bogalusa
 The Era-Leader, Franklinton 
 Washington Parish Free Fair

Towns in Louisiana
Parish seats in Louisiana
Towns in Washington Parish, Louisiana
1819 establishments in Louisiana